The Hero Cycle is the debut studio album by the American melodic death metal band Light This City. This was the band's, and label's first album release. The Hero Cycle is being re-issued through Prosthetic Records. The original date was set to be released August 18, 2009 but was later pushed back to January 19, 2010.

Track listing
"Apostate" – 4:30
"Picture Start" – 2:29
"Give Up" – 3:24
"Parisian Sun" – 2:03
"Cold" – 3:30 (At the Gates cover)
"Laid to Rest" – 3:20
"Sierra" – 3:28
"No Solace In Sleep" - 3:49
"The Weight of Glory" - 2:51
"Next to Godliness" - 3:49

Lyrics written by Laura Nichol, music written by Ben Murray.

Band line-up
Laura Nichol - vocals
Steven Shirley - guitar
Mike Dias - bass
Ben Murray - drums

Additional credits
Additional vocals on "The Weight of Glory" by Phil Benson
Additional guitar on "Cold" by Jeff Allen

References

Light This City albums
2003 debut albums